Number Ten Creek is a creek in the Moira River and Lake Ontario drainage basins in Belleville, Hastings County, Ontario, Canada.

Course
It flows west into an unnamed pond where it takes in an unnamed right tributary, then turns south. The creek continues to the east of the community of Phillipston, then heads southwest through the community of Zion Hill.

See also
List of rivers of Ontario

References

Rivers of Hastings County